Shrubb is a surname. Some notable people with the surname include:

Alfred Shrubb (1879–1964), English distance runner
Paul Shrubb (1955–2020), English footballer, coach, and scout

Notable people with the related surname Shrubbs include:

Joyce Shrubbs (1927–2021), British military officer

See also
 Shrub (disambiguation)

English-language surnames